Black Hill Conservation Park, formerly the Black Hill National Park, is a  protected area  in the Australian state of South Australia located approximately   northeast of the state capital of Adelaide. The conservation park is in a rugged bush environment, with a prominent peak, bounded by steep ridges on the southern slopes.

Geography and climate
Black Hill Conservation Park covers around  within the Mount Lofty Ranges, which run north-south to the east of Adelaide's coastal plain. 

It is located in the suburbs of Athelstone and Montacute and is bounded to the north by Gorge Road and to the south by Montacute Road.
The conservation park lies mostly on the northern side of Fifth Creek.

The conservation park adjoins Morialta Conservation Park, home to many activities, including bushwalking, bird watching and rock climbing.

The main access to the conservation park is via the vehicle entrance off Maryvale Road, and there is walking access at various points along Marble Hill Road.

The conservation park receives average annual rainfall of  mostly between May and September. During the summer months (December to February) temperatures can rise above .

The conservation park is classified as an IUCN Category III protected area.

History
The land first received protected area status as the Black Hill National Park proclaimed on 27 January 1972 under the National Parks Act 1966 in respect to land in sections 669, 670 and 671 of the cadastral unit of the Hundred of Adelaide and section 526 of the Hundred of Onkaparinga. On 27 April 1972, the national park was reconstituted as the Black Hill Conservation Park under the National Parks and Wildlife Act 1972.

In 1982, it was listed on the now-defunct Register of the National Estate.

Prior use of the land
The land used by the Morialta Conservation Park was traditionally occupied by the Kaurna people. Most of the Kaurna elders died before much of their culture could be recorded, and so little is known of the pre-colonial history of the area. It is known that they used fire both as an aid to hunting, and to regenerate the vegetation.

Private landholdings were given over to a wildflower garden on the north edge of the conservation park which has now officially been handed over to the conservation park. The Friends of the Black Hill and Morialta Conservation Parks have a building on site where meetings are held and activities are based/conducted for help with the wildflower garden and the two conservation parks.

Activities
The conservation park caters for a variety of activities, including bushwalking, picnics and bird watching. There are many walking paths within the conservation park, including the Yurrebilla and Heysen Trails.

Being only  from the centre of Adelaide, Black Hill is an accessible but often overlooked conservation park area. There are picnic grounds near the conservation park's Administration buildings and this area links in with the Athelstone oval and Wadmore Park, a Campbelltown City Council reserve.

See also
 List of protected areas in Adelaide

References

External links
Black Hill Conservation Park official webpage
Black Hill Conservation Park webpage on protected planet

Conservation parks of South Australia
Protected areas in Adelaide
Protected areas established in 1972
1972 establishments in Australia
South Australian places listed on the defunct Register of the National Estate